The legislature of the U.S. state of Massachusetts is known as the General Court. It has a 40-member upper house (Massachusetts Senate) and a 160-member lower house (Massachusetts House of Representatives). Descended from the colonial legislature, the first Massachusetts General Court met in October 1780 and consisted of one-year elected terms for both houses. This was expanded to two-year terms starting with the 142nd General Court in January 1921.

Legislatures

1780-1899

 1st Massachusetts General Court (1780–1781)
 2nd Massachusetts General Court (1781–1782)
 3rd Massachusetts General Court (1782–1783)
 4th Massachusetts General Court (1783–1784)
 5th Massachusetts General Court (1784–1785)
 6th Massachusetts General Court (1785–1786)
 7th Massachusetts General Court (1786–1787)
 8th Massachusetts General Court (1787–1788)
 9th Massachusetts General Court (1788–1789)
 10th Massachusetts General Court (1789–1790)
 11th Massachusetts General Court (1790–1791)
 12th Massachusetts General Court (1791–1792)
 13th Massachusetts General Court (1792–1793)
 14th Massachusetts General Court (1793–1794)
 15th Massachusetts General Court (1794–1795)
 16th Massachusetts General Court (1795–1796)
 17th Massachusetts General Court (1796–1797)
 18th Massachusetts General Court (1797–1798)
 19th Massachusetts General Court (1798–1799)
 20th Massachusetts General Court (1799–1800)
 21st Massachusetts General Court (1800–1801)
 22nd Massachusetts General Court (1801–1802)
 23rd Massachusetts General Court (1802–1803)
 24th Massachusetts General Court (1803–1804)
 25th Massachusetts General Court (1804–1805)
 26th Massachusetts General Court (1805–1806)
 27th Massachusetts General Court (1806–1807)
 28th Massachusetts General Court (1807–1808)
 29th Massachusetts General Court (1808–1809)
 30th Massachusetts General Court (1809–1810)
 31st Massachusetts General Court (1810–1811)
 32nd Massachusetts General Court (1811–1812)
 33rd Massachusetts General Court (1812–1813)
 34th Massachusetts General Court (1813–1814)
 35th Massachusetts General Court (1814–1815)
 36th Massachusetts General Court (1815–1816)
 37th Massachusetts General Court (1816–1817)
 38th Massachusetts General Court (1817–1818)
 39th Massachusetts General Court (1818–1819)
 40th Massachusetts General Court (1819–1820)
 41st Massachusetts General Court (1820–1821)
 42nd Massachusetts General Court (1821–1822)
 43rd Massachusetts General Court (1822–1823)
 44th Massachusetts General Court (1823–1824)
 45th Massachusetts General Court (1824–1825)
 46th Massachusetts General Court (1825–1826)
 47th Massachusetts General Court (1826–1827)
 48th Massachusetts General Court (1827–1828)
 49th Massachusetts General Court (1828–1829)
 50th Massachusetts General Court (1829–1830)
 51st Massachusetts General Court (1830–1831)
 52nd Massachusetts General Court (1831)
 53rd Massachusetts General Court (1832)
 54th Massachusetts General Court (1833)
 55th Massachusetts General Court (1834)
 56th Massachusetts General Court (1835)
 57th Massachusetts General Court (1836)
 58th Massachusetts General Court (1837)
 59th Massachusetts General Court (1838)
 60th Massachusetts General Court (1839)
 61st Massachusetts General Court (1840)
 62nd Massachusetts General Court (1841)
 63rd Massachusetts General Court (1842)
 64th Massachusetts General Court (1843)
 65th Massachusetts General Court (1844)
 66th Massachusetts General Court (1845)
 67th Massachusetts General Court (1846)
 68th Massachusetts General Court (1847)
 69th Massachusetts General Court (1848)
 70th Massachusetts General Court (1849)
 71st Massachusetts General Court (1850)
 72nd Massachusetts General Court (1851)
 73rd Massachusetts General Court (1852)
 74th Massachusetts General Court (1853)
 75th Massachusetts General Court (1854)
 76th Massachusetts General Court (1855)
 77th Massachusetts General Court (1856)
 78th Massachusetts General Court (1857)
 79th Massachusetts General Court (1858)
 80th Massachusetts General Court (1859)
 81st Massachusetts General Court (1860)
 82nd Massachusetts General Court (1861)
 83rd Massachusetts General Court (1862)
 84th Massachusetts General Court (1863)
 85th Massachusetts General Court (1864)
 86th Massachusetts General Court (1865)
 87th Massachusetts General Court (1866)
 88th Massachusetts General Court (1867)
 89th Massachusetts General Court (1868)
 90th Massachusetts General Court (1869)
 91st Massachusetts General Court (1870)
 92nd Massachusetts General Court (1871)
 93rd Massachusetts General Court (1872)
 94th Massachusetts General Court (1873)
 95th Massachusetts General Court (1874)
 96th Massachusetts General Court (1875)
 97th Massachusetts General Court (1876)
 98th Massachusetts General Court (1877)
 99th Massachusetts General Court (1878)
 100th Massachusetts General Court (1879)
 101st Massachusetts General Court (1880)
 102nd Massachusetts General Court (1881)
 103rd Massachusetts General Court (1882)
 104th Massachusetts General Court (1883)
 105th Massachusetts General Court (1884)
 106th Massachusetts General Court (1885)
 107th Massachusetts General Court (1886)
 108th Massachusetts General Court (1887)
 109th Massachusetts General Court (1888)
 110th Massachusetts General Court (1889)
 111th Massachusetts General Court (1890)
 112th Massachusetts General Court (1891)
 113th Massachusetts General Court (1892)
 114th Massachusetts General Court (1893)
 115th Massachusetts General Court (1894)
 116th Massachusetts General Court (1895)
 117th Massachusetts General Court (1896)
 118th Massachusetts General Court (1897)
 119th Massachusetts General Court (1898)
 120th Massachusetts General Court (1899)

1900-2000

 121st Massachusetts General Court (1900)
 122nd Massachusetts General Court (1901)
 123rd Massachusetts General Court (1902)
 124th Massachusetts General Court (1903)
 125th Massachusetts General Court (1904)
 126th Massachusetts General Court (1905)
 127th Massachusetts General Court (1906)
 128th Massachusetts General Court (1907)
 129th Massachusetts General Court (1908)
 130th Massachusetts General Court (1909)
 131st Massachusetts General Court (1910)
 132nd Massachusetts General Court (1911)
 133rd Massachusetts General Court (1912)
 134th Massachusetts General Court (1913)
 135th Massachusetts General Court (1914)
 136th Massachusetts General Court (1915)
 137th Massachusetts General Court (1916)
 138th Massachusetts General Court (1917)
 139th Massachusetts General Court (1918)
 140th Massachusetts General Court (1919)
 141st Massachusetts General Court (1920)
 142nd Massachusetts General Court (1921–1922)
 143rd Massachusetts General Court (1923–1924)
 144th Massachusetts General Court (1925–1926)
 145th Massachusetts General Court (1927–1928)
 146th Massachusetts General Court (1929–1930)
 147th Massachusetts General Court (1931–1932)
 148th Massachusetts General Court (1933–1934)
 149th Massachusetts General Court (1935–1936)
 150th Massachusetts General Court (1937–1938)
 151st Massachusetts General Court (1939)
 152nd Massachusetts General Court (1941–1942)
 153rd Massachusetts General Court (1943–1944)
 154th Massachusetts General Court (1945–1946)
 155th Massachusetts General Court (1947–1948)
 156th Massachusetts General Court (1949–1950)
 157th Massachusetts General Court (1951–1952)
 158th Massachusetts General Court (1953–1954)
 159th Massachusetts General Court (1955–1956)
 160th Massachusetts General Court (1957–1958)
 161st Massachusetts General Court (1959–1960)
 162nd Massachusetts General Court (1961–1962)
 163rd Massachusetts General Court (1963–1964)
 164th Massachusetts General Court (1965–1966)
 165th Massachusetts General Court (1967–1968)
 166th Massachusetts General Court (1969–1970)
 167th Massachusetts General Court (1971–1972)
 168th Massachusetts General Court (1973–1974)
 169th Massachusetts General Court (1975–1976)
 170th Massachusetts General Court (1977–1978)
 171st Massachusetts General Court (1979–1980)
 172nd Massachusetts General Court (1981–1982)
 173rd Massachusetts General Court (1983–1984)
 174th Massachusetts General Court (1985–1986)
 175th Massachusetts General Court (1987–1988)
 176th Massachusetts General Court (1989–1990)
 177th Massachusetts General Court (1991–1992)
 178th Massachusetts General Court (1993–1994)
 179th Massachusetts General Court (1995–1996)
 180th Massachusetts General Court (1997–1998)
 181st Massachusetts General Court (1999–2000)

2001-current
 182nd Massachusetts General Court (2001–2002)
 183rd Massachusetts General Court (2003–2004)
 184th Massachusetts General Court (2005–2006)
 185th Massachusetts General Court (2007–2008)
 186th Massachusetts General Court (2009–2010)
 187th Massachusetts General Court (2011–2012)
 188th Massachusetts General Court (2013–2014)
 189th Massachusetts General Court (2015–2016)
 190th Massachusetts General Court (2017–2018)
 191st Massachusetts General Court (2019–2020)
 192nd Massachusetts General Court (2021–2022)

See also
 List of Massachusetts Senate delegations
 List of presidents of the Massachusetts Senate
 List of former districts of the Massachusetts Senate
 List of speakers of the Massachusetts House of Representatives
 List of former districts of the Massachusetts House of Representatives
 Old State House (Boston) building in which the legislature met until 1798
 Massachusetts State House, built in 1798
 List of governors of Massachusetts
 History of Massachusetts

References

Further reading

External links

 
  (digitized published directories)
 
 
  
  (bibliographic catalog of works related to the General Court)
 Index to reports of the Massachusetts Legislative Research Council:  1900-1988, 1988-1994

Legislatures
Legislature
 
Massachusetts
Massachusetts
Massachusetts
Legal history of Massachusetts